State Route 287 (SR 287) is a  route that serves as a connection between Exit 37 off Interstate 65 (I-65) north of Bay Minette and U.S. Route 31 (US 31) in downtown Bay Minette in Baldwin County.

Route description

The southern terminus of SR 287 is located at its intersection with US 31 in the central business district of Bay Minette. From this point, the route travels in a northwesterly direction through its intersection with SR 59, where it turns towards the northeast. The route continues in this northeasterly direction where it meets I-65 and ultimately terminates just to the north of the interchange and transitions to County Road 47 (CR 47).

Major intersections

References

287
Transportation in Baldwin County, Alabama